Face Down in Turpentine is the first studio album by the band Baboon. It was released in June 13, 1994 on Grass Records.

Track listing
 "Master Salvatoris" – 1:44
 "Tool" – 4:05
 "Step Away" – 3:53
 "Good Friend" – 3:19
 "Happy Life" – 2:40
 "Positive" – 4:04
 "Why'd You Say Die?" – 3:49
 "Emotionless" – 3:20
 "Thumbhead" – 1:57
 "Sucker" – 4:02
 "Kamikaze" – 1:55
 "Naked in the Mall/California Dreaming" – 4:01
 "Bright Lights Big Mommy" – 2:50
 "E" – 4:31

All songs by Baboon.

Personnel
 Steven Barnett - drums
 Andrew Huffstetler - vocals, trombone
 Bart Rogers - bass guitar, backing vocals
 Mike Rudnicki - guitar, backing vocals
 Sam McCall - producer

References

1994 debut albums
Baboon (band) albums